Steyr Arms is a firearms manufacturer based in Sankt Peter in der Au, Austria. Originally part of Steyr-Daimler-Puch, it became independent when the conglomerate was broken up in 1989. Prior to 1 January 2019, the company was named Steyr Mannlicher AG.

History

Origins

Steyr has been on the "iron road" to the nearby Erzberg mine since the days of the Styrian Otakar dukes and their Babenberg successors in the 12th and 13th century, and has been known as an industrial site for forging weapons. The privilege of iron and steel production, particularly for knives, was renewed by the Habsburg duke Albert of Austria in 1287. After the Thirty Years' War, thousands of muskets, pistols, and carbines were produced annually for the Habsburg Imperial Army.

In 1821, Leopold Werndl (1797–1855), a blacksmith in Steyr, began manufacturing iron parts for weapons. After his father's death, 24-year-old Josef Werndl (1831–1889) took over his factory. On April 16, 1864, he founded the "Josef und Franz Werndl & Comp. Waffenfabrik und Sägemühle in Oberletten" (Josef and Franz Werndl & Partners Weapons Factory and Sawmill in Oberletten), from which later emerged the "Österreichische Waffenfabriksgesellschaft" (ŒWG, Austrian Arms-Manufacturing Company), a stock company (AG) since 1869, of which the Steyr Mannlicher firearm production was a part. In 1912 Bodencreditanstalt bank became a majority shareholder.

World War I
Werndl's cooperation with engineer Ferdinand Mannlicher (1848–1904), who had patented an advanced repeating rifle in use by the Austro-Hungarian Army, made ŒWG one of the largest weapon manufacturers in Europe. First applied in 1890, the Mannlicher M1901, and the Steyr-Hahn M1912 became milestones in auto-loading pistol technology. At the beginning of World War I, with more than 15,000 employees, production output was 4,000 weapons per day.

The company introduced the world's first machine pistol, the Steyr Repetierpistole M1912/P16, during World War I; it was a machine pistol version of the Steyr M1912 pistol, and was manufactured as product model Repetierpistole M1912/P16. It used a 16-round fixed magazine loaded via 8 round stripper clips, a detachable shoulder stock and a rather large exposed semi-auto/full-auto selector switch on the right side of the frame above the trigger (down = semi & up = full). It fired the 9×23mm Steyr cartridge, with a full-auto rate-of-fire of about 800 to 1,000 rounds per minute (RPM). It weighed about 2.6 pounds. Introduced in 1916, it is considered one of the world's first full-auto capable pistols. Only 960 M1912/P16 were made.

Aftermath of World War I
After the war, weapons production in Steyr was all but entirely prohibited according to the 1919 Treaty of Saint-Germain, and the company faced bankruptcy. To survive, the ŒWG converted their machinery to concentrate on producing Steyr automobiles under chief designers Hans Ledwinka and Ferdinand Porsche, as well as bicycles (colloquially called Waffenräder ("weapon bicycles")). In 1926 the company changed its name to "Steyr-Werke", in 1934 to Steyr Daimler Puch. The production of Steyr Daimler Puch weapons continued in cooperation with Patronenfabrik Solothurn AG at Zuchwil in neutral Switzerland.

World War II
After the Austrian Anschluss to Nazi Germany in 1938, the Steyr factories were incorporated into the Reichswerke Hermann Göring industrial conglomerate and the outbreak of World War II provided a brief revival in weapons production. Like many other companies, Steyr Daimler Puch relied on forced labour, employing from the Steyr-Münichholz subcamp of KZ Mauthausen.

1950s
During the 1950s the Mannlicher–Schönauer full stock rifle, designed in 1900, experienced a renaissance. Simultaneously, the re-emergence of the Austrian Armed Forces in the Second Republic was the base for new military weapons production.

The AUG

In the 1970s, Steyr developed an innovative assault rifle, the StG 77. A bullpup design, the StG 77 extensively utilized synthetic materials, and integrated fixed optics. The export version became the Steyr AUG—Armee Universal Gewehr ("Universal Army Rifle"), eventually used by the armed forces of over 24 countries. It has been prominently featured in films such as Octopussy, Commando, and Die Hard.

In 1989, after the partial dissolution of the Steyr Daimler Puch conglomerate, the weapon division was named Steyr Mannlicher in honour of the great Austro-Hungarian engineer Ferdinand Mannlicher, in 2019 Steyr Arms.

Products
Assault rifle
AUG — bullpup assault rifle
ACR — experimental flechette rifle
STM556 — modular assault rifle

Battle rifle
StG-58

Rifles
M1886 — bolt-action rifle
M1888 — bolt-action rifle 
M1890 — bolt-action rifle 
M1895 — bolt-action rifle
Dutch Mannlicher M.95 — bolt-action rifle
Mannlicher–Schönauer — bolt-action rifle
 Steyr Model 1912 Mauser — bolt-action rifle
Steyr SSG 69 — sniper rifle
Steyr Scout — scout rifle
Steyr SSG 04 — sniper rifle
Steyr SSG 08 — sniper rifle
Steyr HS .50 —  anti-materiel rifle
Steyr IWS 2000 — 15.2 mm anti-materiel rifle

Submachine guns
MPi 69 (Variant: Steyr MPi 81)
TMP

Pistols
M1894 (1894–?)
M1901 (1901–1903)
M.7 (1908–1913)
M1912 (1912–1945)
SP (1957-1964)
GB (1981–1988)
M Series (1999–present)

Grenade launchers
GL 40 — side loading 40 mm grenade launcher

Date codes

Steyr pistols are marked with a three-digit date code on the slide just forward of the ejection port.
The first letter represents the month of manufacture.
The second and third letters represent the last two digits of the year of manufacture.

In this example, the date code "BOY" indicates a pistol manufactured in April 2007.

See also
Steyr Sportwaffen GmbH

References

External links
 
 

Companies of Austria-Hungary
Firearm manufacturers of Austria

Economy of Lower Austria
1864 establishments in the Austrian Empire